Dents and Shells is the sixth album by singer-songwriter Richard Buckner, released in 2004 by Merge Records.

Release 
Dents and Shells was released in October 2004. Merge Records celebrated the album's fifteenth anniversary with a re-release on white vinyl in 2019.

Reception 
In an 8/10 Pitchfork review, Brian Howe wrote, "Since that first album, Buckner has created increasingly more ephemeral, impressionistic gradations of tone and mood. Dents and Shells continues to explore Buckner's shadowy continent of song, a Symbolist mirror-world where bright glints of detail fleetingly flash, then submerge, cloaked in shifting fogs...  While strongly rooted in classic folk, Buckner's songs are rendered pristinely strange by their smallness and smeariness-- they're vast, dim topographies described by chords that are barely there, recondite realms of visions and visitations."

In a 3.5 star review comparing Buckner to Elliott Smith and Lou Reed, Darcie Stevens of the Austin Chronicle wrote, "Without elation or regret, Buckner speaks stories, explanations of missteps and wrong turns, contemplations of lost loves and past lives. Dents and Shells is the travelogue of such a road-worn songwriter. A beater of a vehicle with more miles than an odometer can count, Buckner is what he writes." 

Gregory McIntosh of AllMusic described Buckner as "grizzly, conceptual, fragmented, brooding, and plaintive."

Track listing 
All songs written by Richard Buckner.

 A Chance Counsel
 Firsts
 Invitation
 Straight
 Her
 Charmers
 Fuse
 Rafters
 Picture Day
 As the Waves Will Always Roll

Personnel 
Richard Buckner – guitar, vocals
Bukka Allen
King Coffey – drums
Eric Conn
Andrew Duplantis – bass
Mike Hardwick – pedal steel
Morales
Gary Newcomb – pedal steel
Jacob Shulze – guitar
Brian Standefer

Artwork by Andrew DeGraff

References 

2004 albums
Richard Buckner (musician) albums
Merge Records albums